Mainstreaming may refer to:

Gender mainstreaming, the practice of considering impacts on men and women of proposed public policy
Youth mainstreaming, a derivative concept focusing on the needs of young people
Mainstreaming (education), the practice of educating students with special needs in regular classes

See also
 Mainstream (disambiguation)